Citizens' Congress can either refer to:

Citizens' Congress of the Republic of Latvia
Congress of Estonia